In geology, the term compression refers to a set of stress directed toward the center of a rock mass. Compressive strength refers to the maximum compressive stress that can be applied to a material before failure occurs. When the maximum compressive stress is in a horizontal orientation, thrust faulting can occur, resulting in the shortening and thickening of that portion of the crust. When the maximum compressive stress is vertical, a section of rock will often fail in normal faults, horizontally extending and vertically thinning a given layer of rock. Compressive stresses can also result in folding of rocks. Because of the large magnitudes of lithostatic stress in tectonic plates, tectonic-scale deformation is always subjected to net compressive stress.

See also

Gravitational compression

Structural geology
Solid mechanics